Timeshare donation is a consumer relief strategy that allows timeshare owners a legitimate way out of their timeshare ownership.  The concept of timeshare donation is less than ten years old, but gains popularity each year as the timeshare resale market continues to falter.  In recent years, due to a severely depressed timeshare resale market owners looking to sell their timeshare have little success.  Timeshare owners also face a myriad of unscrupulous timeshare listing companies looking for large up-front fees with the promise that their timeshare will soon be out of their name.  Typically the listing company cannot sell their timeshare, nor do they have an incentive because they can collect another listing fee after the original listing contract expires.  For many timeshare owners, trying to sell their timeshare becomes a vicious cycle of broken promises, high fees, and little to no interest from buyers. According to the Florida Attorney General’s Office, timeshare owners are also especially vulnerable to timeshare resale scams. Ultimately, many owners look to simply give-away, or donate their timeshare to a willing party because their timeshare investment has become a liability.

Methods
Currently there are several methods to give-away or donate your timeshare.

Sale to relative or friend
The first is to find a willing relative or friend who might make good use of the timeshare.  This method commonly involves selling the timeshare for $1 and proceeding with the formal transfer of title, typically performed by a timeshare closing and escrow company.

Donation to a charity
The second method is calling your favorite charity to see if they accept timeshare donations. Some charities are able to utilize timeshare weeks to generate revenue; by renting them to donors, or offering the vacation week for auction at a charity event.  However, most charities are unable to take on deeded ownership of your timeshare, so they opt to sell the timeshare for you.  If a charity sells the timeshare on your behalf and keeps the proceeds as the donation, the donor is then entitled to a tax deduction.

Donation in exchange for tax-deduction
The third method involves donating your timeshare to charity in exchange for a generous tax-deduction. Many large charities in the United States, such as United Cerebral Palsy utilize a third-party to receive and process timeshare donations. If a donor's timeshare donation is accepted into their particular program, the donor will receive a tax receipt for income tax purposes, along with additional info on how to process their charitable tax deduction.  Donors can take the deduction if they itemize their taxes, and can utilize it on both federal and state returns.

If the timeshare property is worth more than $5,000, you'll need a written appraisal in conformity with IRS standards. Publication 561 provides details on the form of written appraisal and the additional paperwork you'll need to attach to your return to secure the deduction. Of course, the danger lies in claiming that your timeshare is worth more than the true market value, i.e. resale value. According to the IRS, “Fair market value is the price at which property would change hands between a willing buyer and a willing seller, neither having to buy or sell, and both having reasonable knowledge of all the relevant facts.” In the depressed timeshare resale market, timeshares are worth far less than what people think they are worth. If you claim your timeshare is worth more than true market value, you could become vulnerable to an IRS audit as well as a stiff fine.

References 

Timeshare